Zheng Xuexuan (born April 1966) is a Chinese executive and politician who is the current chairman of the China State Construction Engineering Group Co., Ltd..

He is an alternate member of the 20th Central Committee of the Chinese Communist Party.

Biography 
Zheng was born in April 1966. He joined the Chinese Communist Party (CCP) in July 1987. In 1989, he graduated from Chongqing Institute of Architecture and Engineering (now Chongqing University).

In January 2017, he became deputy general manager of the China State Construction Engineering Group Co., Ltd., rising to general manager in November 2019. On 16 November 2021, the Organization Department of the Chinese Communist Party appointed him chairman of the group, replacing Zhou Naixiang, who was chosen as governor of Shandong in September.

References 

1966 births
Living people
Chongqing University alumni
Alternate members of the 20th Central Committee of the Chinese Communist Party